Kate O'Toole is a radio presenter from Sydney, Australia. With past experience on ABC Local Radio, she worked as a current affairs reporter for Triple J.

As an agricultural science graduate, O'Toole has been working in rural radio for several years, including Port Pirie in South Australia, Port Macquarie in New South Wales and Mackay in Queensland.

From 10 July 2006 to 3 December 2010 she presented national youth radio network Triple J's current affairs program Hack.

O'Toole has stated she wants to continue presenting politics from a young person's perspective.

Currently she is presenting the Morning Show on ABC Darwin, replacing Leon Compton who moved to Hobart.

References

External links 
Kate O'Toole's page on the Triple J site

Year of birth missing (living people)
Living people
Triple J announcers
Australian women radio presenters
People educated at James Ruse Agricultural High School